"I Love You" is the second single from Dru Hill's third album, Dru World Order. The single peaked at #77 on the Hot 100 and #27 on the R&B chart. The song stayed on the Hot 100 charts for a total of thirteen weeks.

Music video
The music video was directed by Little X. The music video features actress and model La’Shontae Heckard, who plays Nokio's girlfriend, and Nokio's real life son, Jordan Ruffin.

Track listing

Charts

Weekly charts

Year-end charts

References

2003 singles
Dru Hill songs
2002 songs